This is a list of churches in the Roman Catholic Archdiocese of New Orleans. The archdiocese encompasses eight civil parishes in Louisiana: St. Bernard, Jefferson (except Grand Isle), Orleans, Plaquemines, St. Charles, St. John the Baptist, St. Tammany, and Washington. There are 108 parishes within the archdiocese. As of June 1, 2009, the archdiocese's parishes are organized into ten deaneries.

Active parishes

Deanery I - Cathedral

Deanery II - City Park-Gentilly

Deanery III - Uptown

Deanery IV - East Jefferson

Deanery V - St. John/St. Charles

Deanery VI - West Bank

Deanery VII - Algiers/Plaquemines

Deanery VIII - St. Bernard

Deanery IX - West St. Tammany-Washington

Deanery X - East St. Tammany-Washington

Non-parish churches

University campus ministry centers
Tulane University and the University of New Orleans have campus ministry centers: St. Thomas More and St. Thomas the Apostle, respectively. They were parishes until 2008.

Suppressed parishes
In 2008 the archdiocese had a plan to close 22 churches, with 16 of them in New Orleans.

Notes

References

Further reading

External links
 Archdiocese of New Orleans website

Churches
 
 
New Orleans
Churches

Churches